The Qualification Competition for the 2010 AFC U-19 Championship.

The Draw

The draw for the 2010 AFC U-19 Championship (Qualifiers) will take place at AFC House on 20 February 2009.

A total of 42 teams will come out of the pots. In the West Zone, there are 24 teams, while the East Zone will comprise 18 teams.

There will be four groups of six teams each in the West Zone and the East will comprise three groups of six teams each.

Qualification

The winner and runners-up of each group qualifies for the 2010 AFC U-19 Championship (Finals). One best third-placed team from the West Zone and one best third-placed team from the East also qualify for the Finals.

Seedings

West Asia
(Ranked 1st to 22nd)

East Asia
(Ranked 1st to 16th)

Notes
 – Withdrew
 – withdrew
 – withdrew
 – withdrew

Matches

Group A 
All matches were held in Kathmandu, Nepal (UTC+5:45).

Group B
All matches in Al Ain, United Arab Emirates

Group C
All Matches in Iraq

Group D
All matches in Iran. Pakistan were stripped of the hosting rights

Group E
All matches in Thailand

Group F
All matches in Bandung, Indonesia

Group G
All matches in Zibo, China PR

Third-placed qualifiers
At the end of the first stage, a comparison was made between the third placed teams of each group. The one best third-placed teams from the West Zone (Group A to D) and one best third-placed team from the East (Group E to G) would also advanced to the 2010 AFC U-19 Championship.

West Zone
Because two groups has one team fewer than the others, following the withdrawal of Bhutan and the Maldives, matches against the sixth-placed team in each group are not included in this ranking. As a result, four matches played by each team will count for the purposes of the third-placed table.

East Zone

Qualifiers

See also
2010 AFC U-16 Championship qualification

References

External links
 Details on AFC.com

2010
qual
Qual